Chen Man Hin (14 November 1924 – 17 August 2022) was a Chinese-born Malaysian politician who served as Member of Parliament (MP) for Seremban from September 1974 to April 1982 and again from November 1983 to October 1990, Seremban Timor from May 1969 to September 1974 and Member of the Negeri Sembilan State Legislative Assembly (MLA) for Rahang from December 1965 to April 1982. He was a founding member of the Democratic Action Party (DAP), presently a component party of the Pakatan Harapan (PH), formerly Pakatan Rakyat (PR), Barisan Alternatif (BA) and Gagasan Rakyat (GR) opposition coalitions. He served as the 1st Life Advisor of DAP from December 1999 to his death in August 2022 as well as the 1st and founding National Chairman of DAP from its founding in March 1966 to his resignation in December 1999.

Early life 
A Hakka Chinese, Chen Man Hin was born in China and sailed to Malaysia at a young age, before the Second World War. In 1946, he studied at the King Edward VII Medical College in Singapore and graduated in 1952. He then worked as a doctor in Singapore and at a hospital in Seremban until 1956, before opening his own clinic.

Political career 
He won his first election in a 1965 by-election for the Rahang state legislative assembly seat in Negeri Sembilan as an independent. He won his first federal parliamentary seat in Seremban Timor, Negeri Sembilan in 1969 under the DAP ticket against Barisan Nasional. Chen Man Hin became the founder of DAP in Seremban with other leaders such as Lim Kit Siang, Dr. Tan Seng Giaw, lawyers Karpal Singh (CEC) and Hu Sepang. Later, he was appointed DAP's Advisor. The DAP headquarters was then located at Choo Teik Building, Seremban. In 1980s Negeri Sembilan was a stronghold of the DAP.

DAP's early leaders are Chan Tech Chan, Dr Liew Ji Sheng, Lim Koon Jie, Chan Kok Kit, Wang Rui Ai, Walter Loh (Setapak), Devan Nair (Secretary-General, later Singapore President), Lee Ming Chang and Goh Hock Guan . Other leaders include Lai Teo Kuan, Mahdevan Nair, Ibrahim Singgeh (Assemblyman), Richard Ho (Setiawan parliament), Fadzlan Yahya Nor Jetty as Deputy Chairman of DAP and Dr. S. Seeveratnam as Treasurer.

Following the death of a Malaysian Chinese Association Assemblyman in Rahang, Negeri Sembilan, Chen Man Hin contested as an independent using the 'cherry blossom' symbol on 9 December 1965 and won. At the time, DAP was in the process of creation and was successfully registered on 18 March, after which he became its national Chairman.

He subsequently won the elections of 1978 and 1986. In 1986, DAP won 24 parliamentary seats and 56 state seats.

In 1999, he lost in Rasah, Negeri Sembilan to Datuk Goh Siow Huat from Barisan Nasional. The then-Secretary-General of DAP Lim Kit Siang and Deputy Chairman Karpal Singh, otherwise known as The Tiger of Jelutong lost their seats as well, whereas their political allies the Malaysian Islamic Party (PAS) won a majority in the Terengganu State Legislative Assembly and formed the state government there, and the newly formed Parti Keadilan Nasional (KeADILan) made gains. Although DAP gained a seat, the party performed below expectations and the results were called "catastrophic" by Lim.  Chen eventually resigned as Chairman of DAP after the 1999 general elections and was replaced by Lim Kit Siang.

Election results

References 

1924 births
2022 deaths
Malaysian medical doctors
Malaysian politicians of Chinese descent
Democratic Action Party (Malaysia) politicians
Asian democratic socialists
Members of the Dewan Rakyat
Members of the Negeri Sembilan State Legislative Assembly